The Cavalier from Wedding (German:Der Kavalier vom Wedding) is a 1927 German silent film directed by Wolfgang Neff and starring Kurt Vespermann, Maly Delschaft and Hanni Weisse.

The film's art direction was by Max Knaake.

Cast
 Kurt Vespermann 
 Maly Delschaft 
 Hanni Weisse 
 Carl Walther Meyer
 Hilde Maroff 
 Hanne Brinkmann 
 Renate Brausewetter 
 Senta Eichstaedt

References

External links

1927 films
Films of the Weimar Republic
Films directed by Wolfgang Neff
German silent feature films
National Film films
German black-and-white films